Carmen Menayo Montero (born 14 April 1998) is a Spanish professional footballer who plays as a defender for  Primera División club Atlético Madrid.

Club career

Santa Teresa
On 19 June 2014, Menayo signed for Santa Teresa, which had just been promoted to the Primera División. She made her debut in the Primera División on 7 September 2014, at the age of 16, where her team lost to Transportes Alcaine by 3 to 1. She was a starter throughout the season and only lost one game per call with the Spain Under-17 team and scored a goal. Although Menayo came to the team as a left winger or forward, she was delaying her position to the side, and with the injury of Paralejo, manager Juan Carlos Antúnez, reconverted her to central defender. The team finished the season in ninth position, achieving the goal of maintaining category.

In the 2015-16 season, Menayo continued to start and only missed two games. Santa Teresa remained in the Primera División by finishing in eleventh position.

Atlético Madrid
Menayo always wanted to study physiotherapy in Madrid and in 2016, after rejecting several offers from other clubs, she had the opportunity to play for Atlético Madrid, with which she could complement her football practice with her studies. On 5 July 2016, Atlético Madrid announced that they officially signed Menayo.

International career

Personal life
Menayo is in a relationship with her former Atlético Madrid teammate Lola Gallardo.

Honours

Club
 Atlético Madrid
 Primera División: 2016–17, 2017–18, 2018-19
 Supercopa de España: 2020-21

International
 Spain
 UEFA Women's Under-17 Championship: Winner 2015
 UEFA Women's Under-19 Championship: Winner 2017

References

External links

Carmen Menayo at BDFútbol
 
 
 

1998 births
Living people
People from Tierra de Mérida - Vegas Bajas
Sportspeople from the Province of Badajoz
Footballers from Extremadura
Spanish women's footballers
Primera División (women) players
Santa Teresa CD players
Atlético Madrid Femenino players
Women's association football midfielders
Lesbian sportswomen
LGBT association football players
Spanish LGBT sportspeople
21st-century LGBT people
Spain women's youth international footballers